was a Japanese linguist who started his career lecturing at Juntendo University, and went on to become full professor at Kyoto Sangyo University. One of the world’s foremost authorities on the Altaic languages, he later made important contributions to the mixed-language theory of the origins of Japanese. Denis Sinor regarded him, together with Shirō Hattori, Samuel E. Martin, and Osada Natsuki as one of the four scholars who have done the most to throw light on the origins of the Japanese language.

Career
Murayama spent much of the Second World War from 1942 to 1945 in Germany, completing post-graduate studies at Berlin University on Comparative linguistics and Altai languages under the supervision of Nikolaus Poppe with particular attention to written materials in the Mongolian language.

References

Publications
 with Ōbayashi Taryō, Nihongo no kigen, Kōbundō, Tokyo 1973
Nihongo no kenkyū-hōhō, Kōbundō, Tokyo 1974
Nihongo no gogen, Kōbundō, Tokyo 1974
Nihongo no genkai, Kōbundō, Tokyo 1975
Nihongo keitō no tankyū, Taishūkan Shoten, Tokyo 1978
Nihongo no tanjō, Chikuma Shobō, Tokyo 1979
with Kokubu Naoichi,Genshi nihongo to minzoku bunka, San'ichi Shobō,1979
Ryūkyūgo no himitsu, Kōbundō, Tokyo 1981
Nihongo no kigen to gogen, San'ichi Shobō, Tokyo 1981
Nihongo Tamirugo kigensetsu hihan, San'ichi Shobō, Tokyo 1982
Ainugo no kigen, San'ichi Shobō, Tokyo 1992

See also
Classification of the Japanese language
Altaic languages

Japanese language
Linguists from Japan
Linguists of Japanese
1908 births
1995 deaths
Academic staff of Kyoto University
People from Ibaraki Prefecture
20th-century linguists